East Stack is a coastal rock outcrop which rises to  on the east side of Hoseason Glacier,  southeast of Edward VIII Bay in Antarctica. It was discovered in February 1936 by Discovery Investigations personnel on the William Scoresby, and probably so named by them for its distinctive appearance and association with nearby West Stack.

References 

Rock formations of Kemp Land